Elka Graham (born 20 October 1981), now known by her married name Elka Whalan, is an Australian former competition swimmer who swam in the 2000 Sydney Olympics and 2004 Athens Olympics. Graham specialised in the 200-metre and 400-metre freestyle events, also swimming the 800-metre freestyle. She represented Australia at numerous international meets, including the Pan Pacific Championships, World Swimming Championships in 2001 and 2003, and the 2002 Commonwealth Games.

She was a member of Australia's 4×200-metre freestyle relay team that finished first at the 2001 World Championships in Fukuoka, only to be disqualified when she and the rest of the relay jumped into the pool to celebrate before all the other teams in the final had finished.

In 2007, she claimed that she was offered performance-enhancing drugs from another member of the Australian swimming team before the 2004 Athens Olympic Games, but refused to name the person.

Graham retired from swimming in May 2006 and is now involved in the media, modelling and corporate speaking. She is married to athlete Thomas Whalan and has four kids.

See also
 List of Olympic medalists in swimming (women)

References

External links
Official website

1981 births
Living people
Sportswomen from New South Wales
Olympic swimmers of Australia
Swimmers at the 2000 Summer Olympics
Swimmers at the 2004 Summer Olympics
Commonwealth Games silver medallists for Australia
Olympic silver medalists for Australia
Australian female freestyle swimmers
World Aquatics Championships medalists in swimming
Medalists at the FINA World Swimming Championships (25 m)
Australian Christians
Swimmers from Sydney
Medalists at the 2000 Summer Olympics
Commonwealth Games bronze medallists for Australia
Olympic silver medalists in swimming
Swimmers at the 2002 Commonwealth Games
Commonwealth Games medallists in swimming
Medallists at the 2002 Commonwealth Games